The Ministry of iTaukei Affairs is a Ministry of Fiji responsible for the preservation of Fijian culture and the economic and social development of indigenous Fijians. The current Minister for iTaukei Affairs is Ifereimi Vasu.

Responsibilities 
The Ministry is tasked in formulating government policies and programs focused entirely on the indigenous population. The Ministry provides a direct link between government, iTaukei institutions and its administration across the fourteen provinces. Through its institutes, it keeps official records relating to iTaukei land, fishing grounds, headship titles, traditional knowledge and expressions of culture.

The Ministry is also tasked to deal with disputes over land, fishing grounds, chiefly and traditional headship titles. The Ministry also formulate advocacy programmes to safeguard the language and culture of the iTaukei.

See also 

 Fijians

References 

Government of Fiji
Government ministries of Fiji